Manambur  is a village in Varkala Taluk of Trivandrum district in the state of Kerala, India. It is situated 9km south-east of Varkala Town and 35km north of State Capital city Trivandrum.Manamboor Subrahmanyaswami temple is famous for kavadi festival.

Demographics
 India census, Manambur had a population of 23198. 
Kavalayoor
Pin Code 695611

References

Villages in Thiruvananthapuram district